Samin is a given name and surname that may refer to

Male given name
Samin Baghtcheban (1925–2008), Iranian composer
Samin Uygun (born 1939), Turkish footballer

Female given name
Samin Gómez (born 1992), Venezuelan racing driver
Samin Nosrat (born 1979), American chef

Surname
Xavier Samin (born 1978), Tahitian male footballer

See also

Samina (name)